Sophie Howard (born 24 February 1983) is a former glamour model from Southport, England. She appeared regularly on Page 3 and in men's magazines such as  Maxim, Nuts and Loaded. In August 2005, Howard was voted 73rd in the FHM UK "100 Sexiest Women" poll. In the 2006 poll, she rose to 68th place.

Biography and career
Sophie Amanda Howard was born and raised in Southport, England.

She later moved to Ellesmere Port. She attended Christ the King Catholic High School and was in the Salvation Army until she was 16.

Howard studied English at Edge Hill University. During this time, she signed to the IMM modelling agency and subsequently appeared in Loaded in its "Almost Famous" and "Sauna Babes" sections. She was discovered by Loaded after she sent the magazine amateur photographs of herself wearing a PVC catsuit. A growing fan base meant that by December 2005 Howard had risen to the cover of the magazine.

Sophie subsequently signed a contract with Loaded, resulting in a relationship advice column and a regular feature called "Sophie's Choice". As of 2006, She was signed to Nuts magazine for about 18 months. In 2006, Sophie's management (IMM) also signed an exclusive, 12-month deal (for 2007) with Dennis Publishing for Sophie to frequently feature in Maxim and Bizarre.

In 2009, Sophie returned to Edge Hill University to study for a degree in mental health nursing. She took a break from modelling in December 2011 in order to focus solely on her studies, before returning to modelling in March 2013.

Personal life
As of 2013, she retired from modelling.

Whilst studying at Sixth form, Howard was diagnosed with Lupus erythematosus, a condition affecting the immune system.

See also

Lupus

References

External links
Mandatory.com profile

Glamour models
Page 3 girls
People from Southport
People with lupus
People educated at King George V College
1983 births
Living people
Alumni of Edge Hill University